Dream Wife is a 1953 romantic comedy film starring Cary Grant and Deborah Kerr made by Metro-Goldwyn-Mayer.

It was directed by Sidney Sheldon and produced by Dore Schary, from a screenplay by Herbert Baker, Alfred Lewis Levitt and Sidney Sheldon. The music score was by Conrad Salinger, the cinematography by Milton R. Krasner and the art direction by Daniel B. Cathcart and Cedric Gibbons. The costume design by Herschel McCoy and Helen Rose received an Oscar nomination. The film's secondary stars included Walter Pidgeon and Betta St. John, with supporting performances by Eduard Franz,  Buddy Baer, Richard Anderson, Dan Tobin, Dean Miller, and Movita.

Plot summary
Businessman Clemson Reade (Cary Grant) breaks off his engagement with workaholic fiance Effie (Deborah Kerr), and becomes engaged to the adoring Princess Tarji (Betta St. John) from the fictional country of Bukistan, whom he sees as an "old-fashioned" girl. As Bukistan is in the midst of making an oil trade agreement with the United States, the State Department assigns a handler to Princess Tarji. Surprisingly, the person given the assignment is Effie.

As Reade endeavors to get close to his fiance, Effie ends up educating the princess about Western ideas of emancipation and the modern role of a wife. Effie teaches Tarji the English language through books about important American feminists. While working with Tarjii Effie comes to moderate some of her own ideas.

Conversely, Reade's attempted courtship of the princess, which he initially conducts by American customs, must be adjusted to Bukistanian tradition. Effie explains to him that the marriage, called "hufi", is followed by a prolonged period of celebration called "bruchah".  These terms are borrowed for comedic effect from the Jewish terms "huppah" — the canopy beneath which the marriage ceremony takes place (thus the ceremony sometimes is called "hupah"), and the "Sheva 'bruchis' or 'sheva brachot'" - the 7 blessings. "Bruchah" means "blessing", and these are recited both at the ceremony and throughout the week-long celebration that follows.

Tarji embraces the ideas Effie presents. She adopts American clothing and allows herself such activities as taking a walk through the city on her own. Not understanding the language, Tarji smiles warmly at the people she passes. A number of the men she passes mistake Tarji's friendliness for romantic intent. Several of them arrive at her apartment, and a fight breaks out between them and Reade. The police are called, with the result being that Tarji is thrown in jail. Outraged, her father travels to the United States with the intent of negating his daughter's engagement. However, Effie charms Tarji's father into reconsidering, much to Reade's dismay. Tarji confesses to Reade that she does not love him, and will not come to their wedding ceremony. Realizing his true feelings are for Effie, Reade is relieved to be released from his commitment.

Tarji is summoned by her father, who lectures her sternly. Despite her earlier assertion, she arrives for her wedding with Reade. He is aghast, and attempts to rebuke her for abandoning her newfound feminist ideals, ultimately succeeding in stopping the marriage. Tarji's father is outraged, but Effie slyly congratulates him, pointing out that he would not let a man like Reade ruin the oil deal he had with the United States, even though he was a scoundrel. Tarji's father agrees to uphold the treaty, despite the wedding not going through. He tells Effie she must love Reade very much, implying he understood her true motives all along. The wedding is cancelled, and Reade and Effie kiss.

Cast

 Cary Grant as Clemson Reade
 Deborah Kerr as Effie
 Walter Pidgeon as Walter McBride
 Betta St. John as Tarji
 Eduard Franz as Khan of Bukistan
 Les Tremayne as Ken Landwell
 Donald Randolph as Ali
 Bruce Bennett as Charlie Elkwood
 Richard Anderson as Henry Malvine
 Dan Tobin as Mr. Brown
 Movita as Rima
 Gloria Holden as Mrs. Jean Landwell
 Gordon Richards as Sir Cecil

Reception 
According to MGM records, the film earned $1,213,000 in the U.S. and Canada and $672,000 elsewhere, meaning it resulted in a loss of $456,000.

In other media 
The character of Princess Tarji was resurrected in one episode of Sheldon's I Dream of Jeannie, titled "This Is Murder" (4/9/66), portrayed by Gila Golan.

References

External links 
 
 
 
 

1953 films
1953 romantic comedy films
American romantic comedy films
American black-and-white films
Films set in New York City
Metro-Goldwyn-Mayer films
Films with screenplays by Sidney Sheldon
1950s English-language films
1950s American films